Euthalia nara, the bronze duke, is a butterfly of the family Nymphalidae (Limenitidinae). It is found in the Indomalayan realm.<ref>[http://ftp.funet.fi/pub/sci/bio/life/insecta/lepidoptera/ditrysia/papilionoidea/nymphalidae/limenitidinae/euthalia/ " "Euthalia" Hübner, [1819] at Markku Savela's Lepidoptera and Some Other Life Forms</ref>

DescriptionAdolias nara n. sp.—Female. Upperside dark glossy golden olive-green, with blackish marginal and sub-marginal lines : forewing with oblique transverse row of six white spots, from middle of costal margin to near posterior angle, also two small sub-apical white spots ; marks within discoidal cell black : hind-wing with two white spots on costal margin near the angle. Underside glossy verdigris -green, apically olive-green : fore-wing with markings as above, but more defined and whiter ; lower part of disc patched with blue-black : hind-wing with transverse row of six white spots from costal margin to near the posterior angle ; indistinct discoidal markings. Ciliae white.
Expanse 3 and 5/12inches.In Museum Entomological Society of London.

SubspeciesE. n. nara India, Sikkim, Nepal, N.Assam; Burma, YunnanE. n. alutoya Fruhstorfer, 1913E. n. nagaensis Tytler, 1940 Naga HilsE. n. kalawrica Tytler, 1940 Shan StatesE. n. shania Evans, 1924 Shan States, Thailand, YunnanE. n. hainanana'' Gu, 1994 Hainan

References

Butterflies described in 1859
nara